Hellinsia ochracealis is a moth of the family Pterophoridae. It is found in Brazil, Nicaragua, Colombia and Peru.

Adults have broad, uniformly black wings with a purplish iridescence. Adults are on wing in January, March and July.

References

ochracealis
Moths described in 1864
Pterophoridae of South America
Moths of Central America
Moths of South America